Owen Dudley Edwards (born 27 March 1938) is an Irish historian and former Reader in Commonwealth and American History at the University of Edinburgh, Scotland.

He is the son of Professor Robert Dudley Edwards and brother to the Irish writer, Ruth Dudley Edwards. He is the general editor of the Oxford Sherlock Holmes series, and is a recognised expert on Sir Arthur Conan Doyle, P. G. Wodehouse and Oscar Wilde.

Dudley Edwards attended Belvedere College, Dublin, University College Dublin, and Johns Hopkins University in Baltimore. 

In 1966 he married Barbara Balbirnie Lee. They have three children.

See also
Auditors of the Literary and Historical Society (University College Dublin)

Selected bibliography
British Children's Fiction in the Second World War (2007)
Hare and Burke (1994) (play) 
City of a Thousand Worlds: Edinburgh in Festival (1991)
Eamon de Valera (1988)
The Quest for Sherlock Holmes (1983)
Burke and Hare (1981; 2nd ed., 1993)
P. G. Wodehouse: A Critical and Historical Essay (1977)
The Sins of our Fathers (1970)

External links
 Profile
 Bio at IMDB

1938 births
Alumni of University College Dublin
20th-century Irish historians
21st-century Irish historians
Johns Hopkins University alumni
Living people
Auditors of the Literary and Historical Society (University College Dublin)
Writers from Dublin (city)
People educated at Belvedere College
Academics of the University of Edinburgh